The 3rd National Congress of the Kuomintang was the third national congress of the Kuomintang, held on 15–28 March 1929 at Nanking, Republic of China. This was the first KMT national congress after the Chinese reunification in 1928 after the northern expedition, thus it was located in the unified ROC capital Nanking.

Results
The congress adopted the Program for a Phase of Political Tutelage.

See also
 Kuomintang

References

1929 conferences
1929 in China
National Congresses of the Kuomintang
Politics of the Republic of China (1912–1949)